The U.S. Army Joint Modernization Command, or JMC, based in Fort Bliss, Texas, gains insights from "Fight Tonight" units about future ways of fighting, future technology, and force structure during realistic live, constructive, and/or simulated training exercises.  Joint Modernization Command is subordinate to the Army Futures & Concepts Center in Joint Base Langley-Eustis, Virginia; both report to the U.S. Army's newest Four-Star Command, the Army Futures Command (AFC) based in Austin, Texas.

Joint Modernization Command (JMC) plans, synchronizes, and executes exportable live field experiments to inform modernization efforts to enable a Multi-Domain Capable Force by 2028.

Purpose

 Execute realistic field experiments and assessments to gain Soldier and Leader feedback focused on Multi-Domain Operations (MDO) Concepts, Capabilities, and Formations at echelon.
 Execute exportable and scalable field experiments to assess MDO Concepts, Capabilities, and Formations for the 2028 MDO-Capable Force.
Execute Joint Warfighting Assessments (JWA) resulting in a focused Initial Insights Report and Joint Exercise Report.
Provide field experimentation and assessment support to Army Cross Functional Teams and their 31 Signature Efforts in accordance with the Army Modernization Strategy.
Coordinate and manage MDO Concepts, Capabilities, and Formations in all Army Live Prototyping Assessment (ALPA) events.
Build Readiness for the units participating in assessments; JMC synchs Commander's training objectives with experiment/assessment requirements.

Leadership
JMC's commanding general was Brig. Gen. Johnny K. Davis, who took command on June 14, 2018, succeeding then BG Joel K. Tyler. Davis was formerly the 80th commander of 3rd U.S. Infantry Regiment (The Old Guard); Tyler assumed command of U.S. Army Test and Evaluation Command.

History

U.S. Army Joint Modernization Command (JMC) was established as the Future Force Integration Directorate (FFID) on June 15, 2006 at Fort Bliss, Texas as a result of a Chief of Staff of the Army (CSA) directive to United States Army Training and Doctrine Command (TRADOC). Established as an on-site integration organization to facilitate development, testing, and evaluation of Future Combat Systems (FCS), FFID was organized as a directorate of the Army Capabilities Integration Center (ARCIC), a subordinate unit of TRADOC. FFID's mission was to prepare, evaluate, and synchronize delivery of FCS-related products with the Program Manager, Future Combat Systems, Brigade Combat Team (FCS BCT).

FFID was officially designated direct authority over the Army Evaluation Task Force (AETF) in support of the modular future force. The AETF was activated on December 16, 2006 as the 5th Brigade Combat Team, 1st Armored Division.  BG James L. Terry, FFID's first Director, was welcomed in a formal ceremony on April 6, 2007. 

FFID's mission was modified in August 2007 to integrate modernization efforts in support of Army transformation to provide FCS-enabled modular brigades in Fiscal Year 2011 and an FCS BCT at full operational capability in 2017.

During its short history, FFID conducted numerous training and testing events as well as demonstrations of FCS capabilities for senior Department of Defense and Army leadership, congressional leaders and staffers, business executives, and national and local news media representatives.

In April 2009, after the Secretary of Defense terminated the FCS program, FFID assumed responsibility for integrating BCT modernization including accelerated delivery of promising capabilities to the operating force. 

In 2010, the Army Vice Chief of Staff directed that FFID, along with Fort Bliss and White Sands Missile Range, become the Army's centerpiece for network integration. Since this would require a full BCT to assess the network, the Chief of Staff of the Army directed the 2nd Brigade, 1st Armored Division to assume the AETF mission.

On Feb. 7, 2011, the Chief of Staff of the Army directed that FFID be re-designated the Brigade Modernization Command (BMC)  with a mission to conduct physical integration and evaluations of the network and capability packages to provide Doctrine, Organization, Training, Materiel, Leadership and Education, Personnel, Facilities, and Policy recommendations to the Army. BMC focused its efforts on integrating test and evaluation events to deliver the Mission Command Network 2020. It conducted two distinct events:  first, the Network Integration Evaluation (NIE) was a highly structured event testing Army Programs of Record; second, the Army Warfighting Assessment (AWA) allowed the Army to assess interim solutions to enduring Warfighting Challenges by incorporating innovative concepts and capabilities into various formations including Joint and Multinational forces.  In addition to accelerating the rate of Army innovation, AWAs enhanced training, Joint/Multinational interoperability, and future force development.

The Network Integration Evaluation was a series of semi-annual evaluations designed to establish a Network Baseline and then rapidly build and mature the Army's tactical Network.  NIE's provided a means to evaluate relevant capabilities in parallel and make incremental improvements based upon a disciplined and professional feedback cycle. The effort was designed to facilitate rapid evaluation of commercial and government network solutions to establish a Network Baseline and then rapidly build from it.  Network Integration Exercise (NIE) 18 at Fort Bliss, TX was the final Network Integration Evaluation.

Army Warfighting Assessments (AWA) were held to assess the capabilities of the Army to meet Army Warfighting Challenges (AWFCs) in a relevant operating environment.

Effective February 7, 2017, BMC was redesignated the U.S. Army Joint Modernization Command (JMC) and the AWA was redesignated as the Joint Warfighting Assessment (JWA). JWAs are the Army's premier modernization exercise and field experimentation venue involving Multi-Domain Operations (MDO).  JMC is uniquely capable of conducting JWAs that focus on validating MDO concepts and capabilities, including new ideas, equipment, technologies, doctrine and formations through Soldier and leader feedback.

Joint Warfighting Assessments 

Joint Warfighting Assessments are the Army's live multi-echelon joint and multinational capstone exercise aligned to either the Europe or Pacific Area of Operations, informed by existing Operation Plan, and set in a 2028 operational environment to demonstrate and assess Multi-Domain Operations (MDO) Concepts, Capabilities, and Formations.

JWAs aim to:

 Improve Force Readiness
 Obtain Soldier/Leader observations and feedback on modernization solutions
 Integrate and assess MDO Concepts, Capabilities, and Formations at Echelon (CJTF-BCT)
 Integrate and assess Joint and Multinational Interoperability

The first Joint Warfighting Assessment JWA 18, was held in Europe in the spring of 2018.

Joint Warfighting Assessment JWA 19 rotated to Joint Base Lewis-McChord in 2019, to assess the Army's Multi-Domain Task Force.

The robotic complex breach concept (RCBC) was demonstrated with "fight tonight" units during a combined arms breach at JWA 18 and JWA 19.  Smoke, breaching assets, and suppression capabilities were all remotely operated while successfully breaching an obstacle.

Joint Warfighting Assessment JWA 20 rotates back to Europe in 2020. JWA 20 will exercise and assess Multi-Domain Operations, force packages, and capabilities.

References, U.S. Army

Futures and Concepts Center, U.S. Army 
Army Futures Command, U.S. Army

External links
Futures and Concepts Center webpage
Army Futures Command webpage

Joint Modernization Command
Commands of the United States Army
Fort Bliss